The 1983–84 Allsvenskan was the 50th season of the top division of Swedish handball. 12 teams competed in the league. Ystads IF won the regular season, but HK Drott won the playoffs and claimed their fourth Swedish title. IK Heim and Visby IF Gute were relegated.

League table

Playoffs

Semifinals
Västra Frölunda–HK Drott 17–21, 23–15, 15–19 (HK Drott advance to the finals)
Ystads IF–LUGI 17–15, 23–25, 17–22 (LUGI advance to the finals)

Finals
HK Drott–LUGI 22–17, 17–14, 21–15 (HK Drott champions)

References 

Swedish handball competitions